Daniel Spiers (born 1868) was a Scottish professional association footballer who played as a centre half. He played in the English Football League for Burnley between 1889 and 1892, making 27 league appearances and scoring one goal.

References

1868 births
Year of death unknown
People from Ayrshire
Scottish footballers
Association football defenders
Burnley F.C. players
Greenock Morton F.C. players
English Football League players